Pope Macarius I of Alexandria was the Coptic Pope of Alexandria and Patriarch of the See of St. Mark from 933 to 953. He is commemorated in the Coptic Synaxarion on the 24th day of Baramhat.

References

10th-century Coptic Orthodox popes of Alexandria
Coptic Orthodox saints
10th-century Christian saints
952 deaths